Isle of Lost Men is a 1928 American silent drama film directed by Duke Worne and starring Tom Santschi, James A. Marcus and Patsy O'Leary.

Cast
 Tom Santschi as Captain Jan Jodahl 
 James A. Marcus as Malay Pete
 Allen Connor as David Carlisle 
 Patsy O'Leary as Alma Fairfax 
 Paul Weigel as Preacher Jason 
 Jules Cowles as Ship's Cook 
 Maude George as Kealani 
 Sailor Sharkey

References

Bibliography
 Munden, Kenneth White. The American Film Institute Catalog of Motion Pictures Produced in the United States, Part 1. University of California Press, 1997.

External links
 

1928 films
1928 drama films
1920s English-language films
Films directed by Duke Worne
American black-and-white films
Rayart Pictures films
1920s American films